Mitteldeutsche Neueste Nachrichten was a German language regional daily newspaper which was based in Leipzig, East Germany. The paper existed between July 1952 and 26 February 1990. Its subtitle was Tageszeitung für Sachsen und Sachsen-Anhalt, and the publisher was Verlag der Nation. Later it was published by a company with the same name. It was an organ of the National-Demokratische Partei Deutschlands. The paper had editions for Halle and Magdeburg.

One of the editors was Johannes Caspar. The last editor was Rainer Duclaud.

References

1952 establishments in East Germany
1990 disestablishments in East Germany
Daily newspapers published in Germany
Defunct newspapers published in Germany
Mass media in East Germany
German-language newspapers
Mass media in Leipzig
Newspapers established in 1952
Publications disestablished in 1990
Socialist newspapers